Chori might refer to:

People
 Silvano "Chori" Shueg (1900 – 1974), Cuban musician
 Alejandro Domínguez (footballer, born 1981), Argentine footballer
 Gonzalo Castro Irizábal (born 1984), known as Chory Castro, Uruguayan footballer

Other
 Children's Hospital Oakland Research Institute, California
 Chori language, from Nigeria
 Chori people, from Bolivia
 Red chori, Indian beans
 Chorizo
 Chori Chori (1956 film), 1956 film
 Chori Chori (2003 film)

See also
 Chory, a given name and surname